Essen-Horst station is located in the district of Horst in the German city of Essen in the German state of North Rhine-Westphalia. It is on the Essen-Überruhr–Bochum-Langendreer line and is classified by Deutsche Bahn as a category 6 station. It is served by Rhine-Ruhr S-Bahn line S 3 every 30 minutes and one bus routes, 167, every 10 minutes, operated by Ruhrbahn.

References

Rhine-Ruhr S-Bahn stations
S3 (Rhine-Ruhr S-Bahn)
Horst
Railway stations in Germany opened in 1986
1986 establishments in West Germany